Conklin is a small unincorporated village south of Washington Dulles International Airport in Loudoun County, Virginia, United States. It is located along SR 620 (Braddock Road) adjacent to the community of South Riding. Prosperity Baptist Church and Settle-Dean Cabin are the centerpieces of Conklin.

Unincorporated communities in Loudoun County, Virginia